Mohammad Hameed Shahid born 23 March 1957 is a Pakistani Short story Writer (افسانہ نگار), Novelist (ناول نگار) and literary critic (نقاد). He is well known for his fiction writings  in Urdu. He was awarded the  Award with Tamgha-e-Imtiaz in 2016, one of the highest literary honour given by the Government of Pakistan.

Early life and education 

Shahid was born on 23 March 1957 in Pindigheb town of the Attock district in Punjab. His father Ghulam Mohammad was prominent social worker and political figure of the area. After his initial education,  Shahid attended the University of Agriculture, Faisalabad from 1974, where he obtained an honors degree in agriculture, horticulture. Next, he attended the University of the Punjab to study law but left before completing his studies in 1983 to return to Pindigheb as his father was seriously ill and later on died. Shahid was great friends with Javaid Anwar.

Banking career 
After the death of his father, Shahid decided to join the Agricultural Development Bank of Pakistan in 1983. 
 

He obtained a banking diploma and also followed a number of courses on banking. He worked as Mobile Credit Officer, Operation Officer, Manager of different bank branches, Zonal Operation Officer, Head Recovery Policy and retired in 2016 while he was Vice President at Head Office Islamabad.

Literary works 
Shahid's first writing was published in 1973 when he was a student of Metric. As a university student, Shahid was editor-in-chief of the university literary magazine Kisht-e-Nau (کشت نو) and it was in 1988 that he began writing fiction. His first book (پیکر جمیل) was published in 1983. His first collection of short stories, entitled Band Ankhoon se Paray (بند آنکھوں سے پرے) was published in 1994, followed by Jannum Jahunam (جنم جہنم) in 1998, Margzaar (مرگ زار) in 2004, Aadmi (آدمی) and Saans lene main dard hota ha (سانس لینے میں درد ہوتا ہے). His novel Mitti Adam Khati Hae (مٹی آدم کھاتی ہے) was published in 2007.

In addition, Shahid has authored books of literary criticism such as Adbi Tanaziaat (ادبی تنازعات), Ashfaq Ahmad: Shakheiat o funn (اشفاق احمد:شخصیت و فن), Urdu Afsana: Soorat-o-Mana (اردو افسانہ صورت و معنی) and Urdu Fiction; Naye Mubahis(اردو فکشن:نئے مباحث). Shahid also translates international literary writing into Urdu and has written plays for television and columns for print media. Several of his stories have been translated into other languages.

Books 
Shahid has published more than 25 books, including Urdu novels, short stories, anthologies and many others.

Short story collections
 Band Aankhon se Pery (بند آنکھوں سے پرے) 1994
Janam Jahanam 1998 (جنم جہنم)
 Marg Zaar  2004 (مرگ زار)
Aadmi 2013 (آدمی)
Saans lene main dard hota ha 2019 (سانس لینے میں درد ہوتا ہے)

Urdu novel
 Mitti Aadam Khati Hai (مٹی آدم کھاتی ہے)
Jang main Mohabbat Ki Tasveer Nahein Banti (جنگ میں محبت کی تصویر نہیں بنتی) 2019 includes in “Saans lene main dard hota ha”

Literary criticism
 Ashfaq Ahmed: Shakhsiat-o-Fuun (اشفاق احمد شخصیت و فن) 1998
Aadbi Tanaziaat (ادبی تنازعات)  (2000)
 Urdu Afsana: Surat o Mana (اردو افسانہ:صورت و معنیٰ) 2006
Fateh M. Malik: Shakhsiat-o-Fuun (فتح محمد ملک: شخصیت و فن) 2008
Kahani aor Llosa sy Muamla (2011(کہانی اور یوسا سے معاملہ
Rashid, Meeraji, Faiz: Nayab Hein Hum (راشد میراجی،فیض:نایاب ہیں ہم)2015
Urdu Fiction: Naye Muhabis (اردو فکشن : نئے مباحث)2015
Manto:Aaj bhi Zinda Ha(منٹو:آج بھی زندہ ہے)2020
Afsana Kese Likhen (افسانہ کیسے لکھیں)2020 
Hustuju Guftugu (جستجو گفتگو) 2020

Other books
 Paiker-re-Jamil (Serat un Nabi PBUH)  پیکر جمیل(1983)
Lamhon Ka Lams (Nasmain) لمحوں کا لمس(1995)
Alif Se Atkhailiyan (Tanziay)الف سے اٹکھیلیاں (1995)

Anthologies
 Pakistani Aadab (Intekhab 2002)  پاکستانی ادب 2003
SAARC Mumalik: Muntakhib Takhliki Aadab (2004)
8th Oct: Tehreer k Aainay Main (2006)
Majmooa Shams ur Rehman Farooqi (مجموعہ شمس الرحمن فاروقی)2021

Awards and nominations
Shahid has won a total of eight awards.

References 

1957 births
Living people
People from Attock District
Pakistani novelists
20th-century Pakistani short story writers
21st-century Pakistani short story writers
Urdu-language novelists
Urdu-language fiction writers
University of Agriculture, Faisalabad alumni
People from Pindigheb